The Deadline is a 2004 EP release from underground hip hop artist Supastition. The EP features the single "Boombox", which was a college radio hit in late 2004.

Track listing

References

2004 EPs
Supastition albums